Roberto Fabián Sánchez Doldán (born 10 April 1988), commonly known as Fabian Sanchez, is a Paraguayan football striker who currently plays in Colombia for Once Caldas.

Career
Sánchez began playing football in Club Olimpia's youth system, before playing professionally with Paraguayan sides 12 de Octubre, General Caballero, Independiente de Campo Grande and River Plate. He played abroad in Greece, Israel and Colombia, where he signed with Once Caldas and reunited with Ángel Guillermo Hoyos his manager at Atromitos F.C.

References

1988 births
Living people
Paraguayan footballers
Paraguayan expatriate footballers
General Caballero Sport Club footballers
12 de Octubre Football Club players
Atromitos F.C. players
Hapoel Ramat Gan F.C. players
Hapoel Rishon LeZion F.C. players
Ahva Arraba F.C. players
Once Caldas footballers
Categoría Primera A players
Expatriate footballers in Greece
Expatriate footballers in Israel
Expatriate footballers in Colombia
Paraguayan expatriate sportspeople in Greece
Paraguayan expatriate sportspeople in Israel
Paraguayan expatriate sportspeople in Colombia
Association football forwards